Valter Klauson (2 January 1914, Tolmachyovo – 5 December 1988, Tallinn) was a Soviet and Estonian politician.

From 1961 to 1984, he was a Chairman of the Council of Ministers of the Estonian Soviet Socialist Republic.

References

1914 births
1988 deaths
People from Luzhsky District
People from Luzhsky Uyezd
Communist Party of Estonia politicians
Central Committee of the Communist Party of the Soviet Union candidate members
Heads of government of the Estonian Soviet Socialist Republic
People's commissars and ministers of the Estonian Soviet Socialist Republic
Members of the Supreme Soviet of the Estonian Soviet Socialist Republic, 1955–1959
Members of the Supreme Soviet of the Estonian Soviet Socialist Republic, 1963–1967
Members of the Supreme Soviet of the Estonian Soviet Socialist Republic, 1967–1971
Members of the Supreme Soviet of the Estonian Soviet Socialist Republic, 1971–1975
Members of the Supreme Soviet of the Estonian Soviet Socialist Republic, 1975–1980
Members of the Supreme Soviet of the Estonian Soviet Socialist Republic, 1980–1985
Fifth convocation members of the Supreme Soviet of the Soviet Union
Sixth convocation members of the Supreme Soviet of the Soviet Union
Seventh convocation members of the Supreme Soviet of the Soviet Union
Eighth convocation members of the Supreme Soviet of the Soviet Union
Ninth convocation members of the Supreme Soviet of the Soviet Union
Tenth convocation members of the Supreme Soviet of the Soviet Union
Recipients of the Order of Friendship of Peoples
Recipients of the Order of Lenin
Recipients of the Order of the Red Banner of Labour
Recipients of the Order of the Red Star
Estonian engineers
Soviet Army officers
Soviet military engineers
Soviet military personnel of World War II
Burials at Metsakalmistu